Strang is a surname. Notable people with the surname include:

Archie Strang (Australian footballer) (1887-1962), Australian footballer
Archie Strang (rugby union) (1906–1989), New Zealand rugby union player
Bill Strang (1883–1937), Australian rules footballer
Charlie Strang (1916-1992), Australian footballer
Colin Strang (1910–1946), Australian rules footballer
Doug Strang (1912–1954), Australian rules footballer
Gavin Strang (born 1943), Scottish politician
Geoff Strang (1944–2003), Australian rules footballer
Gilbert Strang, mathematician
Gordon Strang (1909–1951), Australian rules footballer
James Strang (1813–1856), Mormon leader
John Strang (1584–1654), Scottish church minister
John Strang (writer) (1795–1863), Scottish writer
Michael L. Strang, American politician
Paul Strang (born 1970), Zimbabwean cricketer
Ray C. Strang, American illustrator
Robert Strang (1901–1976), English cricketer
Robert Strang (physician), Canadian physician
Sammy Strang (1876–1932), American baseball player
Walter Strang ((1888–1944), New Zealand cricketer and businessman
William Strang (1859–1921), Scottish artist
William Strang (footballer) (1878–1916), Scottish footballer
William B. Strang Jr. (1857–1921), American railroad magnate

Occupational surnames